is a Japanese manga artist born 13 January 1955 in the town of Nakaniida (now Kami), Kami District, Miyagi Prefecture, Japan, though he lives in the city of Sendai. He is best known for his manga series Bonobono and Ninpen Manmaru. In 1988, he won the Kodansha Manga Award for general manga  for Bonobono and the Shogakukan Manga Award for children's manga for Ninpen Manmaru.

Profile
After leaving  before graduating, Igarashi worked for an advertising company in their print shop. While working there, he made his professional debut as a manga artist in 1972.

Works
Bonobono
Ninpen Manmaru
Kamurobamura-e
Hitsuji no Ki (2011-2014)

References

External links
 Profile  at The Ultimate Manga Guide

1955 births
Living people
Manga artists from Miyagi Prefecture
Winner of Kodansha Manga Award (General)